Parienia is a genus of moths belonging to the subfamily Olethreutinae of the family Tortricidae. This genus was described by Edward Meyrick in 1881. It consists of only one species, Parienia mochlophorana, which is endemic to New Zealand.

References

Tortricidae genera
Olethreutinae
Endemic fauna of New Zealand
Moths of New Zealand
Monotypic moth genera
Taxa named by Carlos Berg
Endemic moths of New Zealand